The Presentation of Benefices Act 1605 (3 Jac 1 c 5) was an Act of the Parliament of England.

The Presentation of Benefices Act 1605, except those parts of that Act whereby it was enacted "that every Person or Persons that is or shall be a Popish Recusant Convict during the Time that he shall be or remain a Recusant shall from and after the End of the then present Session of Parliament be utterly disabled to present to any Benefice with Cure or without Cure, Prebend or other Ecclesiastical Living, or to collate or nominate any Free School, Hospital or Donative whatsoever, and from the Beginning of the then present Session of Parliament shall likewise be disabled to grant any Avoidance to any Benefice, Prebend, or other Ecclesiastical Living," and which specified the counties, cities and other places and limits or precincts within which the Chancellor and Scholars of the University of Oxford  and the Chancellor and Scholars of the University of Cambridge respectively had the presentation, nomination, collation and donation of and to every such benefice, prebend, living, school, hospital and donative as was to happen to be void during such time as a patron thereof was to be and remain a recusant convict as aforesaid, and whereby it was provided "that neither of the said Chancellors and Scholars of either of the said Universities shall present or nominate, to any Benefice with Cure, Prebend, or other Ecclesiastical Living, any such Person as shall then have any other Benefice with Cure of Souls, and if any such Presentation or Nomination shall be had or made of any such Person so beneficed, the said Presentation or Nomination shall be void, any thing in this Act to the contrary notwithstanding:" was repealed by section 1 of the 7 & 8 Vict c 102.

Section 13 was repealed by section 41(2) of, and Schedule 5 to, the Patronage (Benefices) Measure 1986.

References
Halsbury's Statutes,

Acts of the Parliament of England
1605 in law
1605 in English law